Runkle was an unincorporated community in Jackson County, West Virginia.

References 

Unincorporated communities in West Virginia
Geography of Jackson County, West Virginia